was a  after Angen and before Yōwa. This period spanned the years from August 1177 through July 1181.

Change of era
 1177 : The new era name was created to mark an event or a number of events.  The previous era ended and a new one commenced in Angen 3, on the 4th day of the 8th month of 1177.

Events of the Jishō era
 1177 (Jishō 1, 28th day of the 4th month): A great fire in the capital was spread by high winds; and the palace was reduced to cinders.
 1178 (Jishō 2, 12th day of the 11th month): Emperor Takakura's consort, Tokuko, gives birth to an infant who will become Emperor Antoku.
 1180 (Jishō 4, 21st day of the 2nd month): Emperor Takakura abdicates.
 1180 (Jishō 4, 21st day of the 4th month): In the 12th year of Takakura-tennōs reign (高倉天皇12年), the emperor was forced to abdicate; and the succession (senso) was received by his infant son, the grandson of Taira Kiyomori.
 1180 (Jishō 4, 22nd day of the 4th month): Emperor Antoku's is said to have acceded to the throne (sokui) on the day of his coronation ceremony.
 1180 (Jishō 4, 2nd day of the 6th month): Former-Emperor Go-Shirakawa-in, former-emperor Takakura-in and Emperor Antoku leave Kyoto for Fukuhara, which is near modern-day Kōbe, Hyōgo.
 1180 (Jishō 4, 26th day of the 11th month): The capital is moved back to Kyoto from Fukuhara.
 1180 (Jishō 4): A devastating whirlwind causes havoc in Heian-kyō, the capital.
 1181 (Jishō 5, 14th day of the 1st month): Emperor Takakura dies.
 1181 (Jishō 5, 25th day of the 4th month): Battle of Sunomata-gawa

References

General

 Brown, Delmer M. and Ichirō Ishida, eds. (1979).  Gukanshō: The Future and the Past. Berkeley: University of California Press. ;  OCLC 251325323
 Nussbaum, Louis-Frédéric and Käthe Roth. (2005).  Japan encyclopedia. Cambridge: Harvard University Press. ;  OCLC 58053128
 Titsingh, Isaac. (1834). Nihon Ōdai Ichiran; ou,  Annales des empereurs du Japon.  Paris: Royal Asiatic Society, Oriental Translation Fund of Great Britain and Ireland. OCLC 5850691
 Varley, H. Paul. (1980). A Chronicle of Gods and Sovereigns: Jinnō Shōtōki of Kitabatake Chikafusa. New York: Columbia University Press.  ;  OCLC 6042764

External links
 National Diet Library, "The Japanese Calendar" -- historical overview plus illustrative images from library's collection

Japanese eras
1170s in Japan
1180s in Japan